The 20th Annual British Academy Television Craft Awards are presented by the British Academy of Film and Television Arts (BAFTA) and was held on 28 April 2019. The awards were held at The Brewery, City of London, and given in recognition of technical achievements in British television of 2018.

Winners and nominees
Winners will be listed first and highlighted in boldface.

Programmes with multiple nominations

Most major wins

See also
2019 British Academy Television Awards

References

External links
British Academy Craft Awards official website

2019 television awards
2018 in British television
British Academy Television Craft Awards
British Academy Television Craft Awards
2019